The Lifan X80 is a Chinese four-door SUV produced by the Lifan Motors division of Lifan Group.

History 

In November 2016, the Lifan X80 debuted at the 2016 Guangzhou Auto Show. In March 2017, the Lifan X80 was launched. Only one engine was offered at launch. A 2.0 litre turbo-charged petrol engine capable of producing 191hp and 286nm of torque. There was two transmissions offered: a 6-speed manual gearbox or a 6-speed automatic gearbox.

References 

Mid-size sport utility vehicles
X80
Cars introduced in 2016
2010s cars
Cars of China